European Rugby Cup Ltd (or ERC) was the governing body and organiser of the two major European rugby union club tournaments; the Heineken Cup and the Amlin Challenge Cup. It was replaced by the European Professional Club Rugby governing body in 2014.

The inaugural Heineken Cup competition was held in 1995–96, with the second tier competition established the following season.

History
The organisation was established in 1995, in preparation for the 1995–96 season, and was headquartered in Dublin. ERC's had nine major shareholders: the six tier 1 unions and three club associations, which were all represented on the board of directors:

 Unions

 Rugby Football Union
 Fédération Française de Rugby
 Irish Rugby Football Union
 Scottish Rugby Union
 Welsh Rugby Union
 Federazione Italiana Rugby

 Club associations

 Premiership Rugby
 Ligue Nationale de Rugby
 Regional Rugby Wales

In 2012, Premiership Rugby and LNR, on behalf of the English and French clubs respectively, notified ERC that they would be withdrawing from the accord governing the competition, being dissatisfied with the organisation of the competition and the distribution of funding. Premiership Rugby subsequently refused to join any new agreement in which ERC remained organisers of European rugby tournaments.

On 10 April 2014 it was announced that the nine shareholders with an interest in continuing major European club competition had come to an agreement for new competitions. Under the new agreement, ERC was wound up, and a new body, European Professional Club Rugby (EPCR), would be created to organise three new competitions, European Rugby Champions Cup, the European Rugby Challenge Cup, and the third tier Qualifying Competition, beginning with the 2014–15 season.

ERC Governance
The Board of ERC, which oversaw the implementation of ERC's strategy for the development of European club rugby, was made up of representatives of the six shareholder unions, league bodies and club representatives and shaped the strategy and development of ERC and the tournaments.

Reporting to and making recommendation the Board were a series of ERC Committees, focusing on the various roles of ERC as a Governing Body and Tournament Organiser and these drew on the experience and expertise of the clubs and Unions from each participation nation.

ERC Committee Structure:
– ERC Commercial Committee
– ERC Rugby Committee
– ERC Match Officials Committee
– ERC Disciplinary Committee
– ERC Finance and Audit Committee

The ERC Executive and team of 20 employees was based in the Dublin headquarters and were charged with implementing the strategy for the development of European club rugby and management of the two tournaments and of the showpiece ERC Finals weekend.

ERC European Player of the Year
Recognised as one of the most prestigious individual accolades in the game, the ERC European Player of the Year honourrd the best player of the European club rugby season from both the Heineken Cup and Amlin Challenge Cup tournaments.

In 2010 ERC launched the ERC15 Awards, recognising the outstanding contributors to the first decade and a half of European competition. The inaugural recipient of the ERC European Player Award, as the best player over the first 15 years of these tournaments, was Munster Rugby's Ronan O'Gara. For the 2010/11 season, ERC moved to present an annual award.

On 26 May 2014, it was announced that Steffon Armitage (Toulon) had been named 2014 ERC European Player of the Year.

Winners: 
Ronan O'Gara (Munster Rugby) – 2010 (Awarded for the previous 15 seasons)
Seán O'Brien (Leinster Rugby) 2011
Rob Kearney (Leinster Rugby) 2012
Jonny Wilkinson (Toulon) 2013
Steffon Armitage (Toulon) 2014
Nick Abendanon (Clermont) 2015

ERC Elite Awards
To celebrate the 10th anniversary season of the Heineken Cup, the ERC Elite Awards scheme was introduced to recognise the most prominent teams and players of the competitions.

Teams with 50 or more appearances

Players with 100 or more Heineken Cup caps

Players with 50 or more Heineken Cup caps

Players with 500 or more Heineken Cup points

Players with 25 or more Heineken Cup tries

References

Heineken Cup
EPCR Challenge Cup
 
1995 establishments in Europe
Rugby union governing bodies in Ireland
Companies based in Dublin (city)
1995 establishments in Ireland
Defunct rugby union governing bodies
International organisations based in Ireland